Spies of No Country: Secret Lives at the Birth of Israel is a book by Matti Friedman published in March 2019.

Spies of No Country is about a pre-independence Zionist intelligence unit, the "Arab Section," that operated inside the territory of the French Mandate for Syria and the Lebanon towards the end of the British Mandate for Palestine.

Synopsis
Spies is the story of four Mizrachi men.    They were not related to one another despite the fact that three of them shared a surname.  They were Gamliel Cohen and Isaac Shoshan,  who grew up in Syria, Havakuk Cohen from Yemen, Yakuba Cohen, from Palestine.   All four were native Arabic speakers.  They operated as mista'arvim, "Ones Who Become Like Arabs," but Friedman raises an interesting question, "They were native to the Arab world," Friedman writes, "as native as Arabs. If the key to belonging to the Arabic nation was the Arabic language, as the Arab nationalists claimed, they were inside. So were they really...pretending to be Arabs, or were they pretending to be people who weren't Arabs pretending to be Arabs?"

Reception
Lily Meyer, reviewing the book for National Public Radio, called Spies "an important book (because) Americans are not accustomed to hearing about Israel's complexity, or its diversity. We are rarely asked to consider Israel as a country that is, as Friedman says, 'more than one thing.'"

Bill Gladstone wrote that "In lesser hands, this story might not be capable of sustaining the interest of readers through more than 200 pages, but Friedman is a natural-born storyteller whose simple but compelling language, and level of insight and sensitivity, seem to anticipate and settle questions in the readers’ minds even before they arise."  For example, early in the book Friedman writes that, "“The unwritten rules of espionage writing seem to require a claim that the subjects altered the very course of history, or at least of their war...  This is tempting but rarely true, I suspect, and it isn’t true in the case of our spies, though their contribution to the war was significant. Their mission didn’t culminate in a dramatic explosion that averted disaster, or in the solution of a devious puzzle. Their importance to history lies instead in what they turned out to be – the embryo of one of the world’s most formidable intelligence services [the Mossad]...”

In a review published in The Forward, Raphael Magarik noted that Friedman repeated Israeli propaganda throughout the book, overlooked evidence that did not support his argument, and misrepresented events. He nevertheless praised Friedman's storytelling.

Awards
Spies of No Country won the 2018, pre-publication, $25,000 Nathan Book Award, a prize given by the Nathan Fund in conjunction with the Jewish Book Council to support the work of a writer whose book has not yet been published.

References 

2019 non-fiction books
English-language books
Books about Israel
Canadian non-fiction books
Books about the Arab–Israeli conflict
Books about Israeli intelligence agencies
Algonquin Books books